Suvaluxmi (born 19 August 1977) is a former Indian actress who predominantly appeared in Tamil films. She also appeared in Bengali, Telugu, Malayalam, Kannada films.

Career
As a child, Suvaluxmi was passionate about Indian classical and folk dance forms and performed the art forms across regional shows. Her performance on stage was noticed by film director Satyajit Ray, who cast her as the female lead in the film adaptation of his story Uttoran (1994). The film, which was completed by his son Sandip Ray following Satyajit Ray's demise, won the National Film Award for Best Screenplay in 1994 and was screened in film festivals around the world, including at Cannes.

Alongside graduating with a degree of Bachelor of Laws from the University of Calcutta in 1998, Suvaluxmi acted as the female protagonist in several movies in South Indian languages. She made her debut in Tamil films with Aasai (1995), a romantic thriller film directed by Vasanth and produced by Mani Ratnam. Suvaluxmi portrayed Yamuna and paired opposite Ajith Kumar, with her character being vigorously pursued by her brother-in-law, portrayed by Prakash Raj. Upon release, the film won positive reviews and performed well at the box office, with all three lead actors getting a boost in their career. Balsekaran's Love Today (1997) opposite Vijay, also performed well commercially. Despite the success of these two films, Suvaluxmi's subsequent films failed to expand her initial popularity and she felt that the rise of glamorous roles for female actors in Tamil films, meant that she found it difficult to find apt characters to portray and was typecast as a homely girl. In the late 1990s, she appeared in several Tamil films, though her roles and the performance of her films failed to get acclaim. In 2001, she opted to quit films and pursue a career as a lawyer and finally signed up to appear in Ponvannan's critically acclaimed film Nadhi Karaiyinile (2003), for which she won positive reviews, with The Hindu noting she gave a "heartrending enactment". She was a leading actress from 1994 till 2001 and successfully completed 8 years in silver screen.

After her marriage, in 2007 she turned down an offer from Mohan Raja to portray a supporting role in Santosh Subramaniam (2008) and restated her retirement from films. Since her departure from the film industry, Suvaluxmi practices as a natural artist and graduated with a degree of Masters of Fine Arts in Illustration during 2013 from the Academy of Art University in San Francisco.

Personal life
She married Professor Swagato Banerjee in 2002 and lived in Geneva and then in San Francisco and then in Louisville.

Filmography

Television
 2001-2002 Soolam as Parvathi/Amman

References

External links
 

Living people
Tamil actresses
1977 births
Actresses in Tamil cinema
Tamil Nadu State Film Awards winners
Actresses from Kolkata
Academy of Art University alumni
Actresses in Bengali cinema
Actresses in Kannada cinema
Actresses in Malayalam cinema
Actresses in Telugu cinema
20th-century Indian actresses
21st-century Indian actresses
Actresses in Tamil television